Siler City Commercial Historic District is a national historic district located at Siler City, Chatham County, North Carolina.  The district encompasses 45 contributing buildings in the central business district of Siler City. They are primarily one- and two-story brick buildings dated between 1897 and 1945. Located in the district is the separately listed Hotel Hadley.  Other notable buildings include the Farmers Alliance Store (1909), Edwards-Wren Building (1906), Chatham Bank (1913), Wren Building (1912), former Siler City Furniture Building (1928), Colonial Revival style United States Post Office (1940), Phillips Office Supplies Building, Thorpe and Associates Building, and Fred C. Justice Building.

It was listed on the National Register of Historic Places in 2000.

References

Historic districts on the National Register of Historic Places in North Carolina
Colonial Revival architecture in North Carolina
Historic districts in Chatham County, North Carolina
National Register of Historic Places in Chatham County, North Carolina